Platform virtualization software, specifically emulators and hypervisors, are software packages that emulate the whole physical computer machine, often providing multiple virtual machines on one physical platform. The table below compares basic information about platform virtualization hypervisors.

General

Features 

  Providing any virtual environment usually requires some overhead of some type or another. Native usually means that the virtualization technique does not do any CPU level virtualization (like Bochs), which executes code more slowly than when it is directly executed by a CPU. Some other products such as VMware and Virtual PC use similar approaches to Bochs and QEMU, however they use a number of advanced techniques to shortcut most of the calls directly to the CPU (similar to the process that JIT compiler uses) to bring the speed to near native in most cases. However, some products such as coLinux, Xen, z/VM (in real mode) do not suffer the cost of CPU-level slowdowns as the CPU-level instructions are not proxied or executing against an emulated architecture since the guest OS or hardware is providing the environment for the applications to run under. However access to many of the other resources on the system, such as devices and memory may be proxied or emulated in order to broker those shared services out to all the guests, which may cause some slow downs as compared to running outside of virtualization.
  OS-level virtualization is described as "native" speed, however some groups have found overhead as high as 3% for some operations, but generally figures come under 1%, so long as secondary effects do not appear.
  See for a paper comparing performance of paravirtualization approaches (e.g. Xen) with OS-level virtualization
  Requires patches/recompiling.
 Exceptional for lightweight, paravirtualized, single-user VM/CMS interactive shell: largest customers run several thousand users on even single prior models. For multiprogramming OSes like Linux on IBM Z and z/OS that make heavy use of native supervisor state instructions, performance will vary depending on nature of workload but is near native. Hundreds into the low thousands of Linux guests are possible on a single machine for certain workloads.

Image type compatibility

Other features 

  Windows Server 2008 R2 SP1 and Windows 7 SP1 have limited support for redirecting the USB protocol over RDP using RemoteFX.
  Windows Server 2008 R2 SP1 adds accelerated graphics support for certain editions of Windows Server 2008 R2 SP1 and Windows 7 SP1 using RemoteFX.

Restrictions 
This table is meant to outline restrictions in the software dictated by licensing or capabilities.

Note: No limit means no enforced limit. For example, a VM with 1 TB of memory cannot fit in a host with only 8 GB memory and no memory swap disk, so it will have a limit of 8 GB physically.

See also 

 List of computer system emulators
 Comparison of application virtualization software
 Comparison of OS emulation or virtualization apps on Android
 Popek and Goldberg virtualization requirements
 Virtual DOS machine
 x86 virtualization

Notes

References 

Platform virtualization software